David Hywel Francis (6 June 1946 – 14 February 2021) was a British politician who served as Member of Parliament (MP) for Aberavon from 2001 to 2015. A member of the Labour Party, he chaired the Welsh Affairs Committee from 2005 to 2010 and the Joint Committee on Human Rights from 2010 to 2015.

Background 
Hywel Francis attended Whitchurch Grammar School and Llangatwg Secondary School. He studied at the University of Wales, Swansea, where he earned a doctorate in history. Francis continued to work at the University of Wales as a professor in Adult Continuing Education before being elected in 2001. At the University of Wales, he founded the South Wales Miners' Library. He also was the chair of the Wales Congress in Support of Mining Communities.  Francis was a speaker of the Welsh language.

Francis was a member of the Gorsedd Cymru from 1986. He was made vice-president of Carers UK and honorary parliamentary patron of the adult learners' body, NIACE. He was a trustee of the Paul Robeson Wales Trust and the Bevan Foundation he founded. He was the South Wales Miners' Museum president. He authored many peer-reviewed articles, book chapters, and several books. Francis is featured in the documentary film After Coal.

He was the son of Dai Francis, who led the South Wales NUM during the industrial unrest of the 1970s. Like his father, he had been a member of the Communist Party of Great Britain.

Political career 
In 1999, Francis became a special adviser to Paul Murphy, the Secretary of State for Wales; Murphy worked in this position until 2000. The following year, he was elected to the House of Commons. He was re-elected in May 2005. He was the chair of the Welsh Affairs Select Committee from 2005 to 2010; chair of the All-Party Parliamentary Group on Archives and History, formerly chair of the All-Party Parliamentary Group (APPG) on Steel and Cast Metal; and chair of the All-Party Carers Group.

Francis voted in favour of a bill that banned smoking in restaurants in April 2003. In December 2004 and October 2005, he voted in favour of the Identity Cards Bill. In March 2002, he voted to ban the hunting of wild mammals with dogs. He voted in favour of the NHS Foundation Trust proposal. He also voted in favour of allowing unmarried heterosexual and homosexual couples to adopt, and in favour of the Civil Partnership Bill. Francis voted in favour of the replacement of the Trident system.

He voted in favour of adding clauses to a bill that allow the Secretary of State to detain indefinitely, pending deportation, anyone he suspects is a terrorist, even if the law forbids that person's deportation from ever taking place. He voted against only allowing people detained at a police station to be fingerprinted and searched for an identifying birthmark if it is in connection with a terrorism investigation. He voted against changing the text in the Prevention of Terrorism Bill from "The Secretary of State may make a control order against an individual" to "The Secretary of State may  for a control order [...]".

In March 2003, he voted that the case had not yet been made for war against Iraq. In June 2003, he voted against a motion that would have recalled the Prime Minister's assertion that Iraq had weapons of mass destruction that could be used at 45 minutes' notice, and against launching an independent inquiry into the intelligence received and the decisions that were based on it. In June 2007, he voted against a motion calling for an independent inquiry by a committee of privy counsellors into the Iraq War.

Francis fought against the closing of Port Talbot's magistrates and the moving of administrative posts to other locations, saying, "Local justice needs to take place in a local setting." He suggested that Wales could have a carers' commissioner based on the Children's Commissioner for Wales.

In February 2011, it was reported that Francis had been quoted in a US diplomatic cable released by WikiLeaks. The cable by a US embassy political officer dated from 2008 and discussed the upcoming Welsh Labour leadership election to choose a successor to the retiring Rhodri Morgan. Francis was quoted as claiming that all of the prospective candidates who were already members of the Welsh Assembly were seen as flawed by the Welsh Labour Party and suggesting that many in the party were hoping for a "white knight" to be "parachute[d] in" from outside the Assembly. However, Francis claimed that he could not recall the conversation, suggesting that "it sounds as if the diplomat suffers from poor shorthand" and stating that "it is on the record that I was an early supporter of  Carwyn Jones [...] I would certainly not have supported such an absurd suggestion as parachuting anyone into the assembly".

On 22 November 2013, Francis announced he would be standing down as MP for Aberavon at the 2015 general election. Stephen Kinnock, son of former Labour leader Neil Kinnock, was selected to succeed Francis as the Labour candidate for Aberavon.

Personal life 
Francis married Mair Price in 1968. They had a son with Down syndrome, who died aged 16 in 1997 of a heart condition.

He died aged 74 from cancer on 14 February 2021, at Morriston Hospital in Swansea, Wales. Francis is survived by his wife and two children.

Publications

References

External links 
Hywel Francis MP official constituency website
Hywel Francis MP Welsh Labour Party profile
South Wales Miners' Library

1946 births
2021 deaths
Academics of the University of Wales
Alumni of Swansea University
Welsh Labour Party MPs
People from Neath
UK MPs 2001–2005
UK MPs 2005–2010
UK MPs 2010–2015
Welsh-speaking politicians
20th-century Welsh historians
Historians of Wales
21st-century Welsh historians